The Swedish Indoor Athletics Championships is an annual indoor track and field competition organised by the Swedish Athletics Association, which serves as the Swedish national championship for the sport. The competition started as a non–official standing jumps contest in 1960, held at the Johanneshovs Isstadion in Stockholm. It expanded to a full indoor track and field competition in 1966, then later attained national championship status in 1984.

Events
The following athletics events feature as standard on the Swedish Indoor Championships programme:

 Sprint: 60 m, 200 m, 400 m
 Distance track events: 800 m, 1500 m, 3000 m
 Hurdles: 60 m hurdles
 Jumps: long jump, triple jump, high jump, pole vault
 Throws: shot put, weight throw
 Combined events: heptathlon (men), pentathlon (women)
 Walks: 5000 m walk (men), 3000 m walk (women)

From 1960 to 1965, the competition consisted of men's standing high jump and standing long jump for both men and women. A men's 2000 metres steeplechase was contested in 1972 and 1975. The 200 metres event was first contested in 1982 and combined track and field events were included in 1986. The men's 5000 m walk and women's 3000 m walk were contested for the first time in 1987. The weight throw was the last expansion, being added to the programme in 2000.

In earlier years, a smaller number of women's events were held. As the scope of women's international athletics increased, so did the national indoor programme. The women's 1500 metres was included in 1971, the 3000 metres in 1979, the triple jump in 1990, and the pole vault in 1996. The championships now has an equal number of men's and women's events.

Editions

Championship records

Men

Women

References 

Editions
Svenska mästerskap. Swedish Athletics Association. Retrieved 2019–07–06.

 
Athletics competitions in Sweden
National indoor athletics competitions
Athletics Indoor
Recurring sporting events established in 1960
1960 establishments in Sweden
February sporting events